Big Fun was a British boy band that was active between 1988 and 1994. The band consisted of Phil Creswick, Mark Gillespie and Jason John (a.k.a. Jason Herbert). They were produced by Stock Aitken Waterman.

Career
Before they were Big Fun, Creswick and John were in another regroup of Ian Levine's boy band Seventh Avenue with Mark Long. The other member of the group at that time was Steve Crawley who provided lead vocals for the group, and sang live at nightclub appearances across the UK. Other original Big Fun members included Keith Davies from Stretford in Manchester, who went on to star in Coronation Street.

Their only album, A Pocketful of Dreams was released in 1990, and reached the top 10 in the UK Albums Chart. Singles released from the album included "Blame It on the Boogie", a cover version of The Jacksons' 1978 hit, "Can't Shake the Feeling", and "Handful of Promises". "I Feel the Earth Move" was intended to be their first single (and promo copies were circulated), but its release was cancelled in favour of "Blame It on the Boogie". Their final single "Stomp!" was issued in 1994, under the name 'Big Fun II' as Jason John had left the band. Although this failed to obtain the commercial success of their earlier work, it reached the dance chart in the United States.

All three members of the band were gay and had been advised by Pete Waterman to keep their sexuality quiet, as he believed it would ruin their career.
After disbanding, Creswick became a painter and decorator, Phil was convicted of drug supply and possession John returned to being a model booker and music manager. John died in Brazil in 2019.

Members
Personnel

Phil Creswick - backing vocals 
Mark Gillespie (Born November 26, 1966) - lead vocalist 
Jason John - backing vocals
 Keith Davies

Discography

Singles

Albums
1990 – A Pocketful of Dreams – UK No. 7, GER No. 39

Video 
 1990 – "A Pocketful of Dreams – The Video Hits"

References

1988 establishments in England
1994 disestablishments in England
English dance music groups
English pop music groups
Dance-pop groups
English boy bands
English LGBT musicians
Musical groups established in 1988
Musical groups disestablished in 1994
British musical trios
Jive Records artists